The Babeș-Bolyai University (commonly known as UBB) is a public research university located in Cluj-Napoca, Romania. UBB has a long academic tradition, started by Universitas Claudiopolitana in 1581. It occupies the first position in the University Metaranking, initiated by the Romanian Ministry of Education and Research in 2016

Babeș-Bolyai University is the largest Romanian university with about 50,000 students. It offers study programmes in Romanian, Hungarian, German, English, and French (as well as a smaller number of programmes at the Master's level taught in Spanish, Italian, and Japanese). The university was named, following the fusion in 1959 of the Romanian and Hungarian-language universities in Cluj, after two prominent scientists from Transylvania, the Romanian bacteriologist Victor Babeș and the Hungarian mathematician János Bolyai. It is one of the five members of the Universitaria Consortium (the group of elite Romanian universities).

UBB is affiliated to the International Association of Universities, Guild of European Research-Intensive Universities, Eutopia, the Santander Group, the Agence universitaire de la Francophonie and the European University Association. Likewise, UBB signed the Magna Charta Universitatum and concluded partnerships with 210 universities in 50 countries, and it is widely considered one of the most prestigious in Eastern Europe. The Babeș-Bolyai University is classified as an advanced research and education university by the Ministry of Education.

History 

The history of the education in Kolozsvár, (Principality of Transylvania) begins in 1581, with the establishment of the Jesuit college by Stephen Báthory. The college received buildings and land within the medieval city walls, specifically on Platea Luporum (the present Mihail Kogălniceanu Street). The first rector of the Collegium Academicum Claudiopolitanum was the Polish Jesuit priest Jakub Wujek. The institution had the rights to confer the university/academic titles of baccalaureus, magister, and doctor. In 1585, there were 230 students studying here, divided into six classes. The language of instruction and learning was Latin. After 1698, the institution was named Universitas Claudiopolitana (see the cover of the book from 1742 by Andreas Matis entitled Peregrinus Catholicus de peregrina unitaria religione), with teachings in Latin and later also in German. In 1753, Empress Maria Theresa changed the status of the university into an imperial one, and in 1773, after the dissolution of the Jesuit Order, the university went under the administration of the Piarist order. In 1786 Universitas Claudiopolitana became the Royal Academic Lyceum (Lyceum Regium Academicum – semiuniversity statute), which was later followed by two institutions with a semiuniversity statute (e.g., offering training at of baccalaureus/magister level, but not at doctor level): (a) the Surgical-Medical Institute and (b) the Academy of Law. This institutions will be later incorporated in the Franz Joseph University.

With the affirmation of the Romanian nation, in the context of the European revolutions of 1848, was explicitly questioned the issue on university in national language. At the express request of the Romanians, in 1870, József Eötvös, then Minister of Education, proposes the creation in Kolozsvár of a university teaching in Hungarian, Romanian and German, idea also welcomed by the Romanian elite. Meanwhile, Eötvös dies, and in 1872, Franz Joseph I legislates the establishment of the Hungarian Royal University of Kolozsvár in Hungarian only, which caused dissatisfaction among Romanians. After the oath, on 20 December 1872, 258 students start courses. There were created four distinct faculties: Faculty of Law and State Sciences, Faculty of Medicine, Faculty of Philosophy, Letters and History, Faculty of Mathematics and Natural Sciences. The faculties were equal to each other and enjoyed internal autonomy. The first rector was Professor Áron Berde from the Faculty of Law, specialist in economics and finance. Besides the four faculties is created a Pedagogical Institute, for training secondary school teachers. From 1895 the girls had the right to learn at university.

After the First World War, and in the context of the Great Union of 1918, the university was taken over by the Romanian authorities and became an institution of Greater Romania. On 12 September 1919, the decree signed by King Ferdinand I stipulated "the transformation of Royal Hungarian Franz Joseph University in Romanian university beginning 1 October 1919". The Hungarian staff who have not sworn allegiance to the Romanian state moved to Szeged where it contributed to the formation of the University of Szeged (1921).

The new Romanian university, initially named Superior Dacia University, later King Ferdinand I University, was composed of four faculties: Law, Medicine, Sciences, Letters and Philosophy. The inaugural lecture, "The Duty of Our Life", was delivered by Vasile Pârvan on 3 November 1919. The official inauguration took place between 31 January and 2 February 1920, in the presence of King Ferdinand I. The first elected rector was Sextil Pușcariu.

In 1940, after territorial revision imposed by the Second Vienna Award, the university was moved to Timișoara and Sibiu, and the former Hungarian university was recreated in the city, returning from the Hungarian University of Szeged. After the end of the Second World War and the repeal of the Vienna Award, on 1 June 1945, Romanian authorities moved back in Cluj the Romanian King Ferdinand I University (later renamed to Victor Babeș University), and established Bolyai University, a state university teaching in Hungarian, with four faculties (Letters and Philosophy, Law and Political Economy, Sciences, and Human Medicine which, in 1948, was separated and moved to Târgu Mureș to form the University of Medicine and Pharmacy).

In the spring of 1959, the two educational institutions were united under the name Babeș-Bolyai University, after two renowned scholars: Romanian biologist Victor Babeș and Hungarian mathematician János Bolyai. In 1995, the Babeș-Bolyai University reorganises its structure, introducing a multicultural based education.

UBB is today a complex university, having programs from art/humanities, social sciences, life and natural sciences, mathematics/computer sciences to engineering and technology.

Campuses

The main campus is located in the city of Cluj-Napoca, with the university buildings spread across the city. The university has 17 student housing areas, totaling 5,280 places to stay (4,964 for students, 100 for athletes and 216 for PhD); most notable are Hașdeu and Economica. All dormitories are renovated, thermally insulated, have double-glazed windows, laminate flooring and chipboard or wood furniture. The Lucian Blaga University Library is located in the city centre. The university also has several colleges located in other cities spread across Transylvania and Maramureș.

Within the university's cultural heritage are the University Museum (established in April 2001, with a collection of more than 750 original and facsimile pieces), the Mineralogical Museum, the Botanical Museum, the Paleontology-Stratigraphy Museum, the Vivarium and the Zoological Museum.

Academics 
Babeș-Bolyai University has almost 50.000 students in 2021. Between 1993 and 2021, the number of students has quadrupled, from 12,247 in 1993 to 48,620 in 2021. The structure of the student body is composed out of 2,239 PhD students, 9,543 master's degree students, and 33,139 undergraduates. The university has 22 faculties and an academic community of over 55.000 members. It offers bachelor's, master's, and PhD degrees, along with advanced postgraduate studies. UBB is the only university in Europe that has four faculties of theology (Orthodox, Reformed, Roman Catholic, and Greek Catholic).

The university is a multicultural institution which is very well illustrated by its structure: there are 291 study programmes in Romanian (148 bachelor's studies and 143 master's studies); 110 study programmes in Hungarian (70 bachelor's studies and 40 master's studies); and 15 study programmes in German (10 bachelor's studies and 5 master's studies). The Hungarian and German minorities are proportionately represented in the Professors' Council and the University Senate.

41.5% of foreign students come from Moldova and Ukraine, 27.4% from EU and EEA, and 31.1% from non-EU and non-EEA states.

Faculties

Ranking 

UBB typically occupies the first position among the Romanian universities in the major international ranking of universities. In 2016, the Romanian Ministry of Education and Research commissioned the University Metaranking, combining the major international rankings of universities, as recognized by IREG). Since 2016, UBB occupies the first position among Romanian universities in the same Metaranking, although the classication process is now undertaken by the independent organization. In February 2022, the Ministry of Education issued a new methodology and metaranking, where UBB also occupied the first place. In 2019, based on British QS STAR academic audit, UBB was evaluated as an international university with excellence in teaching and research. In 2021, another QS audit granted the university a five-star rating, which is indicative of a world-class university, with an internationally recognized reputation across multiple academic fields.

Hungarian section 
In 1995, the Babeș-Bolyai University introduced an educational system backed by the High Commissioner on National Minorities and based on multiculturalism and multilingualism, with three lines of study (Romanian, Hungarian and German) at all levels of academic degrees.

The Hungarian section enrolls 4,874 students in 115 study programmes (75 bachelor's level and 40 master's level); the university is thus the principal institution that educates members of the Hungarian minority in Transylvania.

Hungarian-Romanian dispute 
The Hungarian section of the university has a partial autonomy, gradually increasing in the recent years. However, in the opinion of the Council of the Hungarian section, those members appointed by the Hungarian-speaking teaching staff desire a more institutionalized form of autonomy. Since university decision-making is based on majority vote of the entire faculty, the Hungarian representatives in minority can always be silenced by this procedure.

In November 2006, Hantz Péter and Kovács Lehel, lecturers at the Babeș-Bolyai University, were discharged by the university after a series of actions started in October 2005 taken for language equality. They were campaigning for the re-organization of the Bolyai University by splitting it in two independent institutions. On 22 November 2006, the university organized an exhibition in the European Parliament, where they tried to give the impression that there are multilingual signs at the university. That day, Hantz added signs like "Information" and "No smoking" in Hungarian alongside those ones in Romanian. The two acted upon a decree permitting the use of multilingual signs, which had been decreed by the university but never put in practice, and official claims that the university is a multicultural institution with three working languages (Romanian, German and Hungarian). On 27 November 2006, the Senate voted for exclusion of the two lecturers, with 72 for and 9 against (from 2 Romanian and 7 Hungarian members) votes. The Hungarian academic community is convinced that the exclusion was not a disciplinary action, but the vote was not ethnic based. In spite of protests, the resignation out of solidarity by several Hungarian-speaking university staff, and a call by 24 Hungarian MEPs for the reinstatement of the lecturers, they remained unemployed. The parties in the Hungarian Parliament asked the university to reinstate the two professors and respect the rights of the Hungarian minority. The presidents of the five parties represented in the Hungarian Parliament signed a statement of protest. Istvan Hiller, the Education Minister of Hungary, wrote to his Romanian counterpart Mihail Hărdău, asking for his help on the issue. The case has also been put forward in the Parliamentary Assembly of the Council of Europe. Göran Lindblad, from the Swedish European People's Party, along with 24 signatories from 19 European countries, presented a motion for a resolution on the alleged breaching of the 1994 Framework Convention for the Protection of National Minorities by the Romanian Government.

The two lecturers sued Romania at the European Court of Human Rights (ECHR) in Strasbourg. Hantz and Kovacs turned to former Hungarian Justice Minister Albert Takács to represent them at the ECHR, eventually accepting the proposal. In 2008, the European Court of Human Rights established that the decision of UBB Senate to exclude Hantz Péter and Kovács Lehel from the teaching staff of the educational institution was legal.

In 2010, the education law has sparked numerous controversies by promoting ethnic segregation in higher education, according to teachers representatives. Anton Hadăr, president of Alma Mater Federation of Trade Unions in University Education considers that the separation of UBB on ethnic criteria would be not only risky but also unproductive. Among main disadvantages would be the increasingly serious gaps of ethnic Hungarians regarding the knowledge of Romanian language. Romanian MEP Corina Crețu warned that adopting the education law, with the claims of UDMR, would have harmful effects especially in Cluj. "Applying the law could lead to breaking UBB", stated Crețu.

Notable people

Faculty and alumni

 Emil Racoviță (1868–1947), savant, explorer, speleologist and biologist
 Iuliu Hațieganu (1885–1959), physician
 Lucian Blaga (1895–1961), philosopher, poet, playwright, translator, journalist, professor, academician and diplomat
 Traian Herseni (1907–1980), sociologist, anthropologist and ethnologist
 Virgil I. Bărbat (1879–1931), sociologist
 Adeyemi Ikuforiji (b. 1958), economist and politician
 Ákos Birtalan (b. 1962), Minister of Tourism
 Ana Blandiana (b. 1942), writer and civil rights activist
 Anatol E. Baconsky (1925–1977), essayist, poet, novelist, journalist, literary theorist and translator
 Andrian Candu (b. 1975), President of the Moldovan Parliament
 Anneli Ute Gabanyi (b. 1942), political scientist, literary critic, journalist and philologist
 Áron Tamási (1897–1966), writer
 Camil Mureșanu (1927–2015), historian
 Corneliu Coposu (1914–1995), founder of the Christian Democratic National Peasants' Party
 Daniel Barbu (b. 1957), historian, senator and Minister of Culture
 Daniel David (b. 1972), psychologist and Rector of the UBB
 Daniel Morar (b. 1966), Head of the National Anticorruption Directorate and Romania's Constitutional Court Judge
 Dumitru Radu Popescu (b. 1935), writer, playwright, scenarist and academician
 Eduard Hellvig (b. 1974), MEP, Minister of Tourism and Director of the Romanian Intelligence Service
 Emil Boc (b. 1966), Prime Minister of Romania and Mayor of Cluj-Napoca
 Emil Hurezeanu (b. 1955), writer, publicist and journalist
 Florin Șerban (b. 1975), film director
 Franz Halberg (1919–2013), scientist and one of the founders of modern chronobiology
 Gabriela Szabó (b. 1975), Olympic athlete and Minister of Youth and Sport
 Gavril Dejeu (b. 1932), lawyer and Interior Minister
 George Coșbuc (1866–1918), poet, literary critic and translator
 George Maior (b. 1967), Director of the Romanian Intelligence Service
 Gheorghe Mureșan (b. 1971), basketball player
 György Frunda (b. 1951), politician
 Hermann Oberth (1894–1989), one of the founding fathers of rocket and astronautics
 Hunor Kelemen (b. 1967), Minister of Culture
 Ioan Gyuri Pascu (1961–2016), musician and actor
 Ioan Oltean (b. 1953), Minister of Environment
 Ion Cârja (1922–1977), writer and political prisoner
 Ion Rațiu (1917–2000), politician
 Ionel Haiduc (b. 1937), chemist, professor and academician
 Iuliu Maniu (1873–1953), Prime Minister of Romania
 Klaus Iohannis (b. 1959), Mayor of Sibiu and President of Romania
 Laura Codruța Kövesi (b. 1973), Chief Prosecutor of the National Anticorruption Directorate
 Mircea Miclea (b. 1963), Minister of Education
 Ovidiu Pecican (b. 1959), writer, historian and publicist
 Pavel Bartoș (b. 1975), actor, comic and TV star
 Péter Eckstein-Kovács (b. 1956), senator and presidential adviser
 Sándor Kányádi (b. 1929), poet
 Sandra Izbașa (b. 1990), Olympic gymnast
 Ștefan Augustin Doinaș (1922–2002), poet, essayist, translator, political prisoner, academician and politician
 Simona Hunyadi Murph, scientist, engineer, inventor, adjunct professor
 Vasile Dîncu (b. 1961), politician and sociologist
 Vasile Pușcaș (b. 1952), professor, diplomat and politician
 Victor Ciorbea (b. 1954), Mayor of Bucharest and Prime Minister of Romania
 Victor Neumann (b. 1953), historian, philosopher of culture and professor

Honorary degree
Doctor Honoris Causa, Professor Honoris Causa include a long list of public personalities, such as:
 Angela Merkel
 Pope Benedict XVI
 Patriarch Bartholomew I of Constantinople
 King Michael I of Romania
 Mario Vargas Llosa
 Ahmed Zewail
 Jean-Marie Lehn
 George Andrew Olah
 George Emil Palade

Rectors

 Sextil Pușcariu (1919–1920)
 Vasile Dumitriu (1920–1921)
 Dimitrie Călugăreanu (1921–1922)
 Iacob Iacobovici (1922–1923)
 Nicolae Bănescu (1923–1924)
 Camil Negrea (1924–1925)
 Gheorghe Spacu (1925–1926)
 Ioan Minea (1926–1927)
 Gheorghe Bogdan-Duică (1927–1928)
 Emil Hațieganu (1928–1929)
 Emil Racoviță (1929–1930)
 Iuliu Hațieganu (1930–1931)
 Nicolae Drăganu (1931–1932)
 Florian Ștefănescu-Goangă (1932–1940)
 Sextil Pușcariu (1940–1941)
 Iuliu Hațieganu (1941–1944)
 Alexandru Borza (1944–1945)
 Emil Petrovici (1945–1951)
 Raluca Ripan (1951–1956)
 Constantin Daicoviciu (1956–1968)
 Ștefan Pascu (1968–1976)
 Ion Vlad (1976–1984)
 Aurel Negucioiu (1984–1989)
 Ionel Haiduc (1990–1993)
 Andrei Marga (1993–2004)
 Nicolae Bocșan (2004–2008)
 Andrei Marga (2008–2012)
 Ioan-Aurel Pop (2012–2020)
 Daniel David (2020–present)

See also 
 Balkan Universities Network
 Iuliu Haţieganu University of Medicine and Pharmacy
 List of modern universities in Europe (1801–1945)
 List of Jesuit sites

References

External links

 
 Lucian Blaga Central University Library
 Geographia Technica Journal of the Faculty of Geography

 
Educational institutions established in 1919
Business schools in Romania
Universities and colleges formed by merger in Romania
History of Cluj-Napoca
1919 establishments in Romania